The fourth edition of the Copa América de Ciclismo was held on January 11, 2004 in São Paulo, Brazil.

Results

References 
 cyclingnews

Copa América de Ciclismo
Copa
Copa
January 2004 sports events in South America